Kang Meas ("Ring of Gold") is a district (srok) located in Kampong Cham province, Cambodia. The district capital is Peam Chi Kang town located some 13 kilometres south of the town of Prey Toteung on National Highway 7 and is 110 kilometres by road from Phnom Penh. National road 70 provides access to the district from the highway and meets provincial road 223 at the district capital. This long relatively narrow district parallels the northern bank of the Mekong for about 40 kilometres between Kampong Cham (city) and Mukh Kampul district in Kandal province. As the district is low-lying, much of the land area of the district is inundated when the Mekong rises during the wet season.

History 
Between 1974 and 1978, two pagodas (wat in Khmer) in Kang Meas district were used as prisons and killing fields by the Khmer Rouge. According to a mapping team who surveyed the region in 1995 and 1996 Wat O Trau Kuon and Wat Nikroath in Peam Chi Kang commune were used as a district prison and regional prison respectively. O Trau Kuon was the main Democratic Kampuchea district prison from 1974 until 1978. Initial victims at this site were soldiers from the army of Lon Nol and then New People who were brought to Kang Meas District from Phnom Penh. Victims were executed at the mass graves close to the Wat. District authorities reported 467 mass graves at this site and estimated that 32,690 victims were executed there. The graves were excavated in 1982 and the remains placed in a memorial stupa near the pagoda.

Wat Nikroath was used as a prison from 1975 when New People were invited to the pagoda to receive food. They were then imprisoned and later executed. District officials recorded 186 mass graves at the site containing an estimated 11,160 victims. Monks from the pagoda reported that they have found names written in blood on the walls when they returned after the fall of the Khmer Rouge. These have now been covered with fresh paint.

Location 
Kang Meas district is in south western Kampong Cham Province. Reading from the north clockwise, Kang Meas shares a border with Cheung Prey and Prey Chhor districts to the north and the district of Kampong Siem to the east. The Mekong River forms the southern boundary of the district and the district boundary includes the river itself to midstream. The Mekong island of Kaoh Andaet is also part of the district. Across the river to the south are Koh Southin and Srei Santhor districts. To the east are Ksach Kandal and Mukh Kampul districts of Kandal province and Batheay district of Kampong Cham to the north east.

Administration 
The Kang Meas district governor reports to Hun Neng, the Governor of Kampong Cham. The following table shows the villages of Kang Meas district by commune.

Demographics 
The district is subdivided into 11 communes (khum) and 93 villages (phum). According to the 1998 Census, the population of the district was 91,212 persons in 17,661 households in 1998. With a population of over 90,000 people, Kang Meas has an average population size for districts in Kampong Cham province. The average household size in Kang Meas is 5.2 persons per household, the same as the rural average for Cambodia. The sex ratio in the district is 91.2%, with significantly more females than males.

References

External links
update 12-09-2019 by yim marin
Kampong Cham at Royal Government of Cambodia website
Kampong Cham at Ministry of Commerce website

Districts of Kampong Cham province